The Hermit Islands are a group of 17 islands within the Western Islands of the Bismarck Archipelago, Papua New Guinea.

History

The first sighting by Europeans of Hermit islands was by the Spanish navigator Iñigo Órtiz de Retes on 29 July 1545 when on board of the carrack San Juan tried to return from Tidore to New Spain. He charted them as La Caimana (a female caiman in Spanish). When passing by, Ortiz de Retes reported that some negroes got near the ship who flung arrows by hand without bows, that were made of flint suitable for striking fire. These islands belong to Micronesian outliers.

World War II
On 17 June 1944, after returning from a bombing mission, 11 aircrew were bailed out from the B-24 Liberator Dropsnoot over the Hermit Islands and landed in rough seas approximately two miles from the southeast of Jalun Island. Four were perished in the drowning, while the other seven were aided by natives for caring until being rescued.

References

Bismarck Archipelago
Archipelagoes of Papua New Guinea
Manus Province